Nikulino is a rural locality (a village) in Opokskoye Rural Settlement, Velikoustyugsky District, Vologda Oblast, Russia. The population was 2 as of 2002.

Geography 
The distance to Veliky Ustyug is 61 km, to Poldarsa is 2 km. Priluki is the nearest rural locality.

References 

Rural localities in Velikoustyugsky District